Cawker City is a city in Mitchell County, Kansas, United States.  As of the 2020 census, the population of the city was 457.  The city is located along the north shore of Waconda Lake and Glen Elder State Park.  It is one of several places claiming to be home of the largest ball of twine in the world.

History
Cawker City was founded in 1870. According to tradition, Colonel E. H. Cawker won naming rights for the town with a winning hand at poker. Cawker City was incorporated as a city in 1874.  The first post office in Cawker City was established in June 1870.

The city previously served many families living on small farms. A resident stated that Cawker City had three grocery stores in the 1960s. By 2017 the community had no grocery stores. Many young adults were leaving to find work elsewhere. In the area family sizes decreased and farm plot sizes increased. These factors caused the community's population to decline.

Geography
Cawker City is located at  (39.508835, -98.433842). The city is located along the north shore of Waconda Lake.

Demographics

2010 census
As of the census of 2010, there were 469 people, 244 households, and 132 families residing in the city. The racial makeup of the city was 97.0% White, 0.2% African American, 0.2% Asian, 0.9% from other races, and 1.7% from two or more races. Hispanic or Latino of any race were 2.1% of the population.

There were 244 households, of which 19.3% had children under the age of 18 living with them, 40.6% were married couples living together, 7.0% had a female householder with no husband present, 6.6% had a male householder with no wife present, and 45.9% were non-families. 41.8% of all households were made up of individuals, and 19.6% had someone living alone who was 65 years of age or older. The average household size was 1.92 and the average family size was 2.52.

The median age in the city was 50.1 years. 18.6% of residents were under the age of 18; 4.5% were between the ages of 18 and 24; 17.9% were from 25 to 44; 32.4% were from 45 to 64; and 26.7% were 65 years of age or older. The gender makeup of the city was 51.4% male and 48.6% female.

2000 census

As of the census of 2000, there were 521 people, 261 households, and 151 families residing in the city. The racial makeup of the city was 97.50% White, 0.19% African American, 1.73% Native American, 0.38% from other races, and 0.19% from two or more races. Hispanic or Latino of any race were 0.77% of the population.

There were 261 households, out of which 17.6% had children under the age of 18 living with them, 48.7% were married couples living together, 6.9% had a female householder with no husband present, and 41.8% were non-families. 37.9% of all households were made up of individuals, and 21.5% had someone living alone who was 65 years of age or older. The average household size was 2.00 and the average family size was 2.61.

In the city, the population was spread out, with 18.0% under the age of 18, 5.0% from 18 to 24, 19.8% from 25 to 44, 27.4% from 45 to 64, and 29.8% who were 65 years of age or older. The median age was 49 years. For every 100 females, there were 98.9 males. For every 100 females age 18 and over, there were 97.7 males.

The median income for a household in the city was $24,833, and the median income for a family was $30,769. Males had a median income of $25,893 versus $17,813 for females. The per capita income for the city was $13,693. About 12.3% of families and 11.6% of the population were below the poverty line, including 14.7% of those under age 18 and 8.3% of those age 65 or over.

Attractions 

 Cawker City is one of several places claiming to be home of the largest ball of twine in the world.  Each year a twine-a-thon is held in August to increase the size of the ball.
 Waconda Lake
 Eyegore's Odditorium and Monster Museum

Education
The community is served by Waconda USD 272 public school district.  The district elementary school is Lakeside Elementary school in Cawker City. The district high school is Lakeside High School (Kansas)|Lakeside High School in Downs with the mascot Knights.

School unification combined Cawker City High School with Glen Elder High School in 1971 forming Waconda East High School. The Waconda East High School mascot was Vikings. Waconda East High School was then unified with Downs High School in 2003 forming USD 272.

Prior to school unification, the Cawker City High School mascot was Cawker City Pirates.

The elementary building was formerly known as Cawker City Elementary School. Its name changed to the current one in 2015.

Notable people
 Martia L. Davis Berry (1844-1894), social reformer
 Merwin Coad, Iowa politician
 Claire Windsor, silent film actress

References

Further reading

External links

 City of Cawker City
 Cawker City - Directory of Public Officials
 Cawker City's Biggest Attraction: World's Largest Ball of Twine
 Historic Images of Cawker City, Wichita State University Library
 Cawker city map, KDOT

Cities in Kansas
Cities in Mitchell County, Kansas